, the number of governors of Minas Gerais, Brazil, since the Proclamation of the Republic in November 15, 1889, reached 50. Until 1930 the governors were called presidents. The current governor is Romeu Zema (NOVO).

Governors in the republican period (1889–present)

References

Minas Gerais